Stipa pennata, common name European feather grass, is a flowering plant and arid zone sand grass in the grass family Poaceae, which is grown as an ornamental plant for its feathery flowering spikes. It is one of the most common plants of the Eurasian Steppe from Mongolia in the east to the Puszta in Hungary and the Devínska Kobyla forest-steppe in Slovakia in the west. Its foliage is green in summer while the flowers are silvery-grey during the same season. Its Hungarian name pusztai árvalányhaj translates as "orphan maidenhair".

References

Further reading

External links
Stipa pennata

pennata
Plants described in 1753
Taxa named by Carl Linnaeus
Grasses of Europe
Flora of temperate Asia